Ultrasound tongue imaging (UTI) has been used for speech production and linguistics research since it came into regular clinical use in the 1960s and 1970s. It is a non-invasive technique allowing researchers to view the shape, position and movements of the tongue (from root to apex) in real time during speech.

It is becoming increasingly popular in linguistics phonetics laboratories across the world as ultrasound units become more portable and affordable. As a result, a conference called "Ultrafest" brings together researchers from around the globe working on the use of UTI. Locations have included the University of Potsdam (2017), University of Hong Kong (2015), Queen Margaret University (2013), Haskins Laboratories (2010 and 2002), New York University (2007), University of Arizona (2005), University of British Columbia (2004).

Current uses of UTI include: 
 experimental phonetics research
 speech-language pathology /therapy 
 second language acquisition 
 phonetics and speech and language therapy/pathology training

References

Linguistics